Thomas Solvoll (born 22 November 1980) is a former Norwegian football goalkeeper.

He joined Hønefoss in 2004, having previously played for IF Birkebeineren, Mjøndalen IF as well as Strømsgodset IF in the Norwegian Premier League. Solvoll played 166 games for Hønefoss before leaving in 2011.

Career statistics

References

1980 births
Living people
Norwegian footballers
Mjøndalen IF players
Strømsgodset Toppfotball players
Hønefoss BK players
Norwegian First Division players
Eliteserien players
Sportspeople from Drammen

Association football goalkeepers